Disconnected EP is a recording by Profane Omen and it was released in 2007.
EP was recorded by Aleksanteri Kuosa and Pekka Mikkola (drums) and Aleksanteri Kuosa and Ville Sorvali (guitars and all that). Album was also mixed by those three and mastered by Minerva Pappi.

Track listing

Chart positions

Personnel

Jules Näveri: Vocals
Williami Kurki: Guitar
Antti Kokkonen: Guitar
Tomppa Saarenketo: Bass
Samuli Mikkonen: Drums

Sari Laine: Guest vocals in "Breed Suffocation, Breed Extinction" 
Taneli Jarva: Guest vocals in "Learning To Die"

External links

References

2007 EPs
Profane Omen albums